Rozhevo is a rural locality (a village) in Nikolotorzhskoye Rural Settlement, Kirillovsky District, Vologda Oblast, Russia. The population was 3 as of 2002.

Geography 
Rozhevo is located 40 km southeast of Kirillov (the district's administrative centre) by road. Slavyanka is the nearest rural locality.

References 

Rural localities in Kirillovsky District